Michael Joseph Dore (1 July 1883 – 13 August 1910) was an Australian representative rugby union and rugby league footballer -  a dual-code international.  He was one of the founding fathers of rugby league in Queensland. Along with Dally Messenger, Denis Lutge, Doug McLean snr and 
John Rosewell he was one of the inaugural five Australian dual code rugby internationals who having earlier represented at rugby union, debuted in international rugby league in Sydney on 9 May 1908 in the first ever Australian league Test against New Zealand.

Rugby union career
Dore was selected as scrum-half for the Australia national rugby union team against New Zealand, at Dunedin, on 2 September 1905. His elder brother Edmund had also represented Australia against the 1904 British Isles tourists.

Rugby league career
Dore's decision to switch codes in 1907 influenced many other Queensland union players including his brother, to join the Rugby League ranks. He was a member of the inaugural committee of the Queensland Rugby Football Association and was a foundation Australian selector. Along with two other of the five inaugural selectors (Arthur Hennessy & Lutge) Dore picked himself in 1908 for the first two rugby league internationals against New Zealand. He played in the first ever trans-Tasman test, which was the debut match of the Australia national rugby league team. He is listed on the Australian Players Register as Kangaroo No.5.

Dore was unable to get leave of absence from his job to attend the 1908–09 Kangaroo tour of England and made his 3rd and final rugby league Test appearance against New Zealand in Sydney in 1909. Altogether he played three Tests for the Australian national team as Half-Back.

References

Sources
 Whiticker, Alan (2004) Captaining the Kangaroos, New Holland, Sydney
 Andrews, Malcolm (2006) The ABC of Rugby League, Austn Broadcasting Corpn, Sydney

1883 births
Australian rugby union players
Australia international rugby union players
Dual-code rugby internationals
Australian rugby league players
Australia national rugby league team players
Queensland rugby league team players
Burials at Nudgee Cemetery
1910 deaths
Rugby union players from Brisbane
Rugby union scrum-halves